Pseudascalenia riadella is a moth in the  family Cosmopterigidae. It is found in Egypt, Saudi Arabia and the United Arab Emirates.

References

Natural History Museum Lepidoptera generic names catalog

Cosmopterigidae